Matthew Reed (born November 8, 1975 in Palmerston North, New Zealand) is an American elite triathlete. Reed became a US citizen in 2007, and lives and trains in Arizona.

In 2009, Reed won 7 triathlons and the Toyota Cup Series.  His triumphs came at Ironman California 70.3, Miami International Triathlon, Pan American Championships, REV 3 Half-Ironman, Life Time Fitness Minneapolis, Chicago Triathlon and Dallas Triathlon.

Reed was named USA Triathlon’s Athlete of the Year for 2008.  He won the US Olympic trials and placed thirty-second at the Beijing Games. Reed also finished fifth in the 2008 World Championships, the highest place ever for an American male.

References

External links
 Official Site

1975 births
New Zealand male triathletes
American male triathletes
Triathletes at the 2008 Summer Olympics
Olympic triathletes of the United States
Living people